SFW may refer to:
 S.F.W., a 1994 film directed by Jefery Levy
 Safi Airways, an airline based in Afghanistan, ICAO designator SFW
 Science Fiction World (科幻世界), a monthly science fiction magazine in China
 Screen-Free Week, annual event where people shall turn off screens (formerly TV Turnoff Week and Digital Detox Week)
 Sensor Fuzed Weapon, a type of cluster bomb system
 Shoppers Food Warehouse, a supermarket chain based in the Washington, D.C., region
 Safe for work, Internet slang for material appropriate for workplaces or schools

See also 
 NSFW (disambiguation)